is a Japanese yakuza film directed by Takashi Miike. The film reunites Miike with Riki Takeuchi, who stars as the main character.

Plot
Seiji (played by Takeuchi) grew up as an orphan who was raised by his boss Muto. The Muto family is composed only of the boss Muto, Seiji and Yoshi and serves as a branch of the larger Date family. When Muto is called upon to settle his dues to the gang, he instead vows to assassinate a top officer of the rival Tendo family. Seiji offers to carry out the assassination himself but Muto forbids it because Seiji already served a 15 year murder sentence for a gang related hit. A day later, Muto is arrested for possession of an illegal firearm and sentenced to serve 2 years in prison.

Seiji ambushes the leader of the Tendo family at his villa and leaves him in critical condition. This act compromises the future of the Date family, and the Tendo family responds quickly with a wave of brutal murders.

While visiting his girlfriend, Yoshi is killed by an assassin squad under the order of the Tendo family. After hearing of his bosses expulsion Seiji returns to the Date headquarters and shoots the first person who yells at him. A member of the Date clan explains boss Muto was expelled because he turned himself into the police and went to prison in order to avoid carrying out the assassination. Seiji readily explains it was he who told on the boss in order to protect him. Seiji carries out the assassination of the number two boss but is shot shortly after.

Seiji then goes to the bar of Muto's wife Sachie, who takes him to a doctor. Soon after, Date is assassinated. The Taiwanese arms dealer shows up at Sachie's house with weapons. Before he leaves he tells her that Seiji must love her because of his actions. Boss Muto is murdered in prison. Seiji then retaliates by killing boss Muto's killer on the way to his trial. Seiji and Sachie plan to escape to the Philippines.

As their boat begins to arrive, Sachie throws Seiji's gun into the water with hopes of a peaceful future. As they turn to get their luggage, they notice Egawa, a policeman who had provided information to Seiji, hanging from a crane nearby. The two become aware they are cornered at the end of the dock and their boat turns around when it sees trouble. The assassin squad closes in on them and open fire as Seiji blocks all the shots from hitting Sachie. As Seiji lies dead, the leader of the assassin squad tells him that he is showing off too much. The squad then walks away without harming Sachie.

Cast
Riki Takeuchi as Seiji
Hideki Sone as Yoshi
Mickey Curtis 
Kenichi Endō as Budai
Renji Ishibashi
Koichi Iwaki 
Hiroshi Katsuno
Ryōsuke Miki
Yasukaze Motomiya
Kazuya Nakayama
Yōko Natsuki
Gorō Oohashi
Mikio Ōsawa 
Tetsurō Tamba 
Columbia Top as Millionaire

Alternate ending
An alternate ending available on the home video release shows Seiji being shot by the assassin squad and then reaching into his chest and pulling out a glowing ball of force that he throws at the assassins, causing an explosion that can be seen from space.

External links

2003 films
2000s Japanese-language films
Yakuza films
Films directed by Takashi Miike
2000s Japanese films